Fetuli M. A. Paea (born 16 August 1994) is a Tongan rugby union player who plays for  in the Bunnings NPC and the  in Super Rugby. He has represented Tonga internationally and has also represented the nation in Rugby sevens. His playing position is Centre or Wing.

Career
He played 9 games for the Mako in 2019, 8 off the bench as the side went unbeaten to claim their first Mitre 10 Cup title.
Following his impressive impact from the bench for Tasman Paea was named in the  squad for the 2020 Super Rugby season.
Paea was again part of the Mako side that won the 2020 Mitre 10 Cup. Paea was named in the Moana Pasifika squad to play the Maori All Blacks in late 2020, starting in the number 13 jersey in a 28-21 loss. Paea missed the entire 2021 Super Rugby season with injury as the  made the Super Rugby Trans-Tasman final. In Round 2 of the 2021 Bunnings NPC Paea suffered another injury while playing for Tasman against , ruling him out for the rest of the competition.

In May 2022 Paea was named in the Tongan national squad for the first time since 2017 for the Pacific Nations Cup.

References

External links
 
 

1994 births
Tongan rugby union players
Tonga international rugby union players
Tonga international rugby sevens players
Living people
Rugby union centres
Tasman rugby union players
Crusaders (rugby union) players
Highlanders (rugby union) players
Moana Pasifika players
Rugby union wings